Alexios Kaballarios or Kaballares was a Byzantine aristocrat and military commander, cousin of Emperor Michael VIII Palaiologos.

He participated in the Byzantine campaigns in the Morea in the early 1260s, and was taken prisoner by William II of Villehardouin after the Battle of Makryplagi (1263/64). 

References

Sources 
 
 
 

1270s deaths
13th-century Byzantine military personnel
Byzantine generals
Byzantine governors of Thessalonica
Byzantines killed in battle
Alexios
Year of birth unknown
Byzantine prisoners of war
Michael VIII Palaiologos